The Ministry of Communications and Digital, is a ministry of the Government of Malaysia that is responsible for digitalisation, communications, multimedia, radio broadcasting, digital terrestrial television broadcasting, other media broadcasts, information, personal data protection, special affairs, media industry, film industry, domain name, postal, courier, mobile service, fixed service, broadband, digital signature, universal service, international broadcasting, and content.

The Ministry is housed in the Sultan Abdul Samad Building in Kuala Lumpur.

Organisation
 Minister of Communications and Digital
 Deputy Minister of Communications and Digital
 Secretary-General
 Under the Authority of Secretary-General
 Legal Advisor Office
 Corporate Communication Unit
 Internal Audit Unit
 Key Performance Indicator Unit
 Integrity Unit
 Deputy Secretary-General (Policy)
 Strategic Planning Division
 Communication Technology Division
 International Division
 Content Development Division
 Deputy Secretary-General (Operations)
 Strategic Communications Division
 Control and Compliance Division
 Infrastructure and Application Division
 Central Agency Committee for Application for Filming and Performance by Foreign Artiste (PUSPAL) Unit
 Senior Under-Secretary (Management)
 Human Resources Management Division
 Finance Division
 Development Division
 Management Services Division
 Account Division
 Information Management Division

Federal departments
 Department of Broadcasting Malaysia, or Jabatan Penyiaran Malaysia, branded as Radio Televisyen Malaysia (RTM).
 Department of Information Malaysia, or Jabatan Penerangan Malaysia.
 Department of Personal Data Protection, or Jabatan Perlindungan Data Peribadi (JPDP).
 Tun Abdul Razak Broadcasting and Information Institute, or Institut Penyiaran Dan Penerangan Tun Abdul Razak (IPPTAR).

Federal agencies
 Bernama (Malaysian National News Agency}, or Pertubuhan Berita Nasional Malaysia (BERNAMA).
 Malaysian Communications and Multimedia Commission (MCMC), or Suruhanjaya Komunikasi dan Multimedia Malaysia (SKMM).
 National Film Development Corporation Malaysia, or Perbadanan Kemajuan Filem Nasional Malaysia (FINAS).
 Malaysia Digital Economy Corporation (MDEC), or Perbadanan Ekonomi Digital Malaysia.
 MYNIC Berhad.

Government company / Government-linked company
 CyberSecurity Malaysia
 MyCreative Ventures Sdn Bhd.
 Mutiara Smart Sdn Bhd.
 MYTV Broadcasting Sdn Bhd.

Key legislation
The Ministry of Communications and Digital is responsible for administration of several key acts:
 Perbadanan Kemajuan Filem Nasional Malaysia Act 1981] [Act 244]
 Bernama Act 1967 [Act 449]
 Digital Signature Act 1997 [Act 562]
 Communications and Multimedia Act 1998 [Act 588]
 Malaysian Communications and Multimedia Commission Act 1998 [Act 589]
 Personal Data Protection Act 2010 [Act 709]
 Postal Services Act 2012 [Act 741]

Policy Priorities of the Government of the Day
 National Creative Industry Policy
 National Film Policy
 Music Industry Development Masterplan
 National Book Policy

Programmes
Universal Services Provision:
 1Malaysia Internet Centre
 Community WiFi
 1Malaysia Netbook
 Cellular Coverage Expansion - Time 3
 Telephony
 Community Broadband Library
 Mini Community Broadband Centre

See also
Minister of Communications and Digital (Malaysia)

References

External links

 Ministry of Communications and Multimedia
 Department of Information
 

Federal ministries, departments and agencies of Malaysia
Malaysia
Malaysia
Malaysia
Malaysia
Communications in Malaysia
Mass media in Malaysia
Ministries established in 2013
2013 establishments in Malaysia
Internet in Malaysia